Wei Ming (1908 – August 22, 1982) was President of East China University of Political Science and Law. He was born in Hejian, Cangzhou, Hebei Province. He joined the Communist Party of China in 1934. In February 1938, he was made a leader of the anti-Japanese resistance government of Hejian. In May 1938, he was made leader of Xin'an County.

References

1908 births
1982 deaths
People from Cangzhou
Presidents of East China University of Political Science and Law